The Ministry of Food and Drug Safety (MFDS), formerly known as the Korea Food & Drug Administration (KFDA), is a government agency responsible for promoting the public health by ensuring the safety and efficiency of foods, pharmaceuticals, medical devices and cosmetics as well as supporting the development of the food and pharmaceutical industries in South Korea. The main goal is to offer people safe foods and drugs.

The headquarters are located in the Osong Health Technology Administration Complex in Cheongju, North Chungcheong Province.

History
In April 1996, Korea Food and Drug Safety and its six regional offices were established. It was raised to the status of administration (Korea Food & Drug Administration), in 1998. In 2004, the organization was restructured with the creation of Medical Devices Management Division and Bioproduct Technical Support Division.  In March 2013, the organization was again restructured and upgraded to a ministry, receiving its name change.

List of ministers

Park Jong-sei, 1998–1999
Huh Kun, 1999-2000
Yang Gyuhwan, 2000-2002
Lee Youngsoon, 2002-2003
Shim Changkoo, 2003-2004
Kim Chungsook, 2004-2006
Moon Changjin, 2006-2007
Kim Myunghyun, 2007-2008
Yun Yeopyo, 2008-2010
Noh Yunhong, 2010-2011
Lee Heesung, 2011-2013
Chung Seung, 2013-2015
Kim Seunghee, 2015-2016
Sohn Mungi, 2016-2017
Ryu Youngjin, 2017-2019
Lee Eui-Kyung, 2019-2020
Kim Ganglip, 2020-

See also 

 List of food safety organisations
 Pharmaceutical Affairs Law (South Korea)

References

External links 
 Ministry of Food and Drug Safety
  Ministry of Food and Drug Safety
 Korean Food and Drug Agency  (Archive)
  Korean Food and Drug Agency  (Archive)

Government ministries of South Korea
Food safety organizations
Organizations established in 1998
Drug policy of South Korea
Medical and health organizations based in South Korea
Regulation in South Korea